Nagisa Sakurauchi (櫻内 渚, Sakurauchi Nagisa, born August 11, 1989) is a Japanese football player as Right back and currently play for FC Imabari.

Career
Sakurauchi begin first youth career with Kansai University from 2008 until he was graduation in 2011.

On 7 April 2011, Sakurauchi begin first professional career with Jubilo Iwata from 2012. On 15 December 2020, he was announced that he would leave in Iwata, where he had been enrolled for nine years due to the expiration of his contract.

On 9 January 2021, Sakurauchi signed J1 club, Vissel Kobe. He leave from the club after two years at Kobe.

On 27 December 2022, Sakurauchi joined J3 club, FC Imabari for upcoming 2023 season.

Career statistics

Club
Updated to the start of 2023 season.

References

External links
Profile at Júbilo Iwata
Profile at FC Imabari

1989 births
Living people
Kansai University alumni
Association football people from Osaka Prefecture
People from Yao, Osaka
Japanese footballers
J1 League players
J2 League players
J3 League players
Júbilo Iwata players
Vissel Kobe players
FC Imabari players
Association football defenders
Universiade gold medalists for Japan
Universiade medalists in football
Medalists at the 2011 Summer Universiade